Arthur Ahnger (28 February 1886 – 7 December 1940) was a Finnish sailor who competed in the 1912 Summer Olympics. He was a crew member of the Finnish boat Lucky Girl, which won the bronze medal in the 8 metre class.

References

External links
list of Finnish sailors

1886 births
1940 deaths
Finnish male sailors (sport)
Sailors at the 1912 Summer Olympics – 8 Metre
Olympic sailors of Finland
Olympic bronze medalists for Finland
Olympic medalists in sailing
Medalists at the 1912 Summer Olympics
20th-century Finnish people